Brian Curley (born November 12, 1959) is a golf course architect. He was raised in Pebble Beach, California where he played, caddied and worked at the area’s iconic courses. He currently resides in Scottsdale, Arizona. Curley is a member of the American Society of Golf Course Architects (ASGCA) and currently serves on its Board of Governors.

Education

Curley is a 1982 graduate of the School of Architecture and Environmental Design, California Polytechnic University, San Luis Obispo, California.

Work experience

Much of his early years in design were spent working alongside golf course designer Pete Dye and future design partner, Lee Schmidt, while working with Landmark Design Company from 1984 to 1992.  Formative years were spent building Kiawah Island (Ocean Course) among other golf courses under Pete Dye.

In 1997, he and Schmidt formed Schmidt-Curley Design, working primarily in the southwest United States.

Schmidt-Curley soon focused much of its business interests on the burgeoning Asian market with a strong emphasis on China. They are considered leaders of the China golf course development movement and were subsequently cited by Golf Inc. in 2011 as one of golf’s most influential architects. Schmidt-Curley was also named “Architect of the Year” by GOLF Magazine in 2011  and “Best Golf Course Architect – Asia-Pacific” by Asian Golf Monthly in both 2011 and 2012. Curley’s design credits include 20 courses at China’s Mission Hills Golf Club.

Schmidt-Curley designed the 10 courses at Mission Hills Haikou, “World’s Largest Golf Club”, which opened in 2010 and is located one hour north of Hong Kong. The resort’s Lava Fields Course was named the “Best New Course” in the International category by GOLF Magazine in 2011. The Blackstone Course was voted the “No. 1 Course in China” and “Best Championship Course – Asia-Pacific” in 2012 by Asian Golf Monthly.

Golf Courses (Original Design)

United States of America
 Bali Hai Golf Club - Paradise, Nevada
 Crosby National Golf Club - Rancho Santa Fe, California
 The Plantation - Indio, California
 Marriott's Shadow Ridge - Palm Desert, California
 Oak Quarry, California
 Southern Dunes Golf Club - Maricopa, Arizona
 The Wilderness Club - Eureka, Montana

Egypt
 Katameya Dunes - New Cairo, Egypt

Sweden
 Vidbynäs Golf Club - Stockholm, Sweden (2 Courses)

Cambodia
 Phnom Penh, East (expected 2024)
 Phnom Penh, West (expected 2024)

China
 Mission Hills Golf Club - Shenzhen, China (10 courses)
 Mission Hills Golf Club - Haikou, China (10 courses)
 Stone Forest International Country Club - Kunming, China (3 Courses)
 Tianjin Binhai Lake - Tianjin, China (2 Courses)

Mexico
 Amanali Country Club, Mexico City, Mexico

Thailand
 Chiangmai Highlands Golf, Chiang Mai, Thailand 
 Siam Country Club (Old), Chon Buri, Thailand
 Siam Country Club (Plantation), Chon Buri, Thailand
 Siam Country Club (Rolling Hills), Chon Buri, Thailand

Vietnam
 An Bien, Ha Long, Vietnam
 FLC Halong Bay, Ha Long, Vietnam
 FLC Quang Binh (Ocean Dunes), Dong Hoi, Vietnam
 FLC Quang Binh (Forest Dunes), Dong Hoi, Vietnam
 FLC Quy Nhon (Mountain), Binh Dinh, Vietnam
 Stone Valley #2, Hanoi, Vietnam
 Stone Valley #3, Hanoi, Vietnam

Select awards

 GOLF Magazine – “Architect of the Year” (2011)  
 Asian Golf Monthly – “Best Golf Course Architects” (2011, 2012, 2013)  
 GOLF Magazine – “Best New” Asia Course (Blackstone Course, Mission Hills Hainan) (2010)  
 GOLF Magazine – “Best New” International Course (Lava Fields Course, Mission Hills Hainan) (2011)  
 Golf World Magazine – “World Top 100” (Lava Fields Course, Mission Hills Hainan) (2011) 
 GOLF INC – #8 Asia's Most Powerful Person in Golf

References

External links 
 American Society of Golf Course Architects profile

Golf course architects
Living people
1959 births
People from Pebble Beach, California